Parker Pass is a broad ice-covered pass on the south side of Zuncich Hill in Marie Byrd Land. McGee rock is on the south side of it. It leads from the head of Siemiatkowski Glacier to the neve area lying southwest of El-Sayed Glacier. Mapped by United States Geological Survey (USGS) from surveys and U.S. Navy air photos, 1959–65. Named by Advisory Committee on Antarctic Names (US-ACAN) for Dana C. Parker, United States Antarctic Research Program (USARP) geophysicist at McMurdo Station, 1967–68.

Mountain passes of Antarctica
Landforms of Marie Byrd Land